Cape Bayle is a cape forming the northeast end of Anvers Island, in the Palmer Archipelago. Charted by the French Antarctic Expedition, 1903–05, under Charcot and named after Vice Admiral Charles-Jesse Bayle (1842–1918), French Navy.

Headlands of the Palmer Archipelago